Fred Alward McCain (November 11, 1917 – October 12, 1997) was a Canadian politician. He served as an MLA in the Legislative Assembly of New Brunswick representing Carleton for the Progressive Conservative Party of New Brunswick from 1952 to 1970. He then moved to federal politics representing the New Brunswick riding of Carleton—Charlotte for the federal Progressive Conservatives from  the 1972 election until his retirement in 1988.

Prior to entering politics, McCain was a produce farmer and teacher.

References

External links
 
Tributes to Fred McCain made in the House of Commons of Canada following his death - from Hansard.

1917 births
1997 deaths
Progressive Conservative Party of Canada MPs
Members of the House of Commons of Canada from New Brunswick
Progressive Conservative Party of New Brunswick MLAs